"Nasty One" is a song recorded by American rapper Lil' Kim. The song was released on July 11, 2018 by Queen Bee Entertainment and eOne.

Background
During an interview with Billboard, Jones described the song as a "happy medium" record that she want in her music, saying: "Things change, and I want to give my fans what I did and little bit of something new. And another thing too: my fans have seen me on some hardcore shit. They've seen me on some gutter 'I'm a gangstress, I will shoot yo ass if you play me or you steal from me.' They've seen that. I've done that. And last but not least... I've lived that. So it's like, let's see another side of Kim. Why not? Let's see a fun side, a sexy side." The song samples the 1989 song  “When I See You Smile” by Bad English.

A remix for the song was released on October 26, 2018, and featured Kranium, HoodCelebrityy, and Stefflon Don.

Music video
On July 31, 2018, the music video leaked on Music Choice. On August 1, it exclusively premiered on Complex.

Release history

References

External links
 

Lil' Kim songs
2018 singles
2017 songs
Songs written by Lil' Kim
MNRK Music Group singles
Songs written by Bkorn